Ahmed Dhabaan (born July 9, 1994) is a Yemeni footballer who plays as an attacking midfielder.

Dhabaan was selected as part of the Yemeni squad at the 2019 AFC Asian Cup.

References

External links 

Living people
1994 births
Yemeni footballers
Yemeni expatriate footballers
Yemen international footballers
Yemeni expatriate sportspeople in Oman
Yemeni expatriate sportspeople in Qatar
Expatriate footballers in Oman
Expatriate footballers in Qatar
Al Yarmuk Al Rawda players
Al-Shamal SC players
Yemeni League players
Qatari Second Division players
2019 AFC Asian Cup players
Association football midfielders